Buffalopterus is a prehistoric eurypterid from the Silurian-aged Bertie Formation of New York and Ontario. The genus contains one species, B. pustulosus. It is closely related to Strobilopterus, but differs primarily by having a bizarre, globular telson (which is otherwise sword-like or spine-like in other eurypterids), and in size, being estimated to be at least 1 meter in length.

See also
 List of eurypterids

References

Eurypteroidea
Silurian eurypterids
Eurypterids of North America
Fossils of Canada
Paleontology in Ontario
Bertie Formation
Fossil taxa described in 1962